Tequistlatec, also called Chontal, are three close but distinct languages spoken or once spoken by the Chontal people of Oaxaca State, Mexico.

Chontal was spoken by 6,000 or so people in 2020.

Languages 
Huamelultec (Lowland Oaxaca Chontal),
Tequistlatec (extinct),
Highland Oaxaca Chontal.

Name
Although most authors use the form tequistlatec(an) today, this is based on an improper derivation in Nahuatl (the correct derivation from Tequisistlán would be Tequisistec(an), and both terms were used by Sapir interchangeably).

Classification
The Tequistlatecan languages are part of the proposed Hokan family, but are often considered to be a distinct family. Campbell and Oltrogge (1980) proposed that the Tequistlatecan languages may be related to Jicaquean (see Tolatecan), but this hypothesis has not been generally accepted.

See also
Huamelultec vocabulary list on the Spanish Wikipedia

Notes

References
Campbell, Lyle and Oltrogge, David. 1980. Proto-Tol (Jicaque). International Journal of American Linguistics, 46:205-223
 Campbell, Lyle. 1979. "Middle American languages." In L. Campbell & M. Mithun (Eds.), The Languages of Native America: Historical and Comparative Assessment, (pp. 902–1000). Austin: University of Texas Press.
Campbell, Lyle. 1997. "American Indian Languages, The Historical Linguistics of Native America." In Oxford Studies in Anthropological Linguistics. Oxford: Oxford University Press

 
Language families
Hokan languages
Indigenous languages of Mexico
Indigenous languages of Central America
Mesoamerican languages
Oaxaca